Abakar Adoum (born 18 August 1984) is a retired Chadian football player. He has made three appearances for the Chad national football team.

See also
 List of Chad international footballers

References

External links
 

1984 births
Living people
Chadian footballers
Chad international footballers
People from N'Djamena
Association football midfielders